Equal marriage can refer to:
Same-sex marriage, as one of many synonyms.
Marriage counseling principle of the married couple having the kind of marriage that is a balanced partnership with equal respect, responsibilities, and power
Feminism topic of legal and social equality of women in marriage, examples in  Medieval India, First-wave feminism,  Women's Strike, and Canadian rights
The custom or legal requirement of Ebenbürtigkeit (marriage selection restricted by the principle of equality of birth) practiced by royalty in Europe and elsewhere; see Royal intermarriage

See also
 Marriage equality (disambiguation)